Doris ocelligera is a species of sea slug, a dorid nudibranch, a marine gastropod mollusk in the family Dorididae.

Distribution
This species occurs in the Mediterranean Sea and in the Atlantic Ocean off the Cape Verdes, the Azores, the Canary Islands, France, the United Kingdom, and Ireland.

References

Dorididae
Gastropods described in 1881
Molluscs of the Atlantic Ocean
Molluscs of the Mediterranean Sea
Molluscs of the Azores
Molluscs of the Canary Islands
Gastropods of Cape Verde
Invertebrates of Europe